Przemyśl Główny (Polish for Przemyśl main station) is the chief railway station serving the city of Przemyśl, in the Subcarpathian Voivodeship, Poland.

The station is located about 15 km from the border with Ukraine.  It has standard gauge tracks for connections to the rest of Poland, as well as broad gauge tracks for the connection with Ukraine.  Hence it serves as an important junction between the railway systems of Poland and Ukraine.

After the 2022 Russian invasion of Ukraine it has become an important transfer point for refugees leaving Ukraine, with about 500,000 refugees passing through the station in the first month of the war.

References

External links
 

Railway stations in Podkarpackie Voivodeship
Buildings and structures in Przemyśl
Railway stations in Poland opened in 1860